The haras ("the Guard") was a personal bodyguard unit of the caliphs during the Umayyads and the Abbasids. The haras was also instituted in the Emirate of Córdoba in present-day Spain.

Origin

Muhammad era 
The Haras were depicted first time during the time of Muhammad, prophet of Islam, where several early Muslim strong man such as Abu Bakr, Sa'd ibn Abi Waqqas, Sa'd ibn Mu'adh, Dzakwan ibn al-Qays, Zubayr ibn al-Awwam, Bilal ibn Rabah, Abbad ibn Bishr, and Abu Ayyub al-Ansari served as the prophet's personal Haras.

Rashidun Caliphate era 
During ascension of Abu Bakar as first caliph and the outbreak of Ridda wars, the Haras wa al-Shurta units under Ali ibn Abi Talib, Sa'd ibn Abi Waqqas, and Zubayr ibn al-Awwam saw combat scenarios in the battle of Zhu Qissa against the rebels who attacked Medina, and later in pursuing the rebels towards Dumat al-Jandal. The caliph has resorted to use this unit as the entire main army of caliphate were brought by Usama ibn Zayd to Expedition of Balqa.

Umayyad Caliphate in Damascus 
The haras also appeared during the rule of Muawiyah I (r. 661–680), the first Umayyad caliph. Most classical accounts reported that he established the haras after an assassination attempt on him. He appointed a mawla, Muslim Abu Abdullah as its chief, and built a guarded room for him inside the mosque that was surrounded by haras members during prayer time. He also had members of the haras walk in front of him with lances in formal processions.

Emirate of Córdoba 
In the Umayyad Emirate of Córdoba, Al-Haras was established by Al-Hakam I, the Umayyad Emir of Córdoba (796-822) in 805. The haras were led by the Visigothic leader of the secular Christians in Cordoba, the Comes (Count) Rabi, son of Theodulf, who also served as the Emir's tax collector. Rabi was later removed and executed by crucifixion for alleged misappropriations.

Professor Christopher I. Beckwith has compared the haras to other royal bodyguard units of Indo-European societies, generally referred to as Comitatus.

Service

Organization 
The haras was led by a chief, who frequently also held security-related and administrative positions such as responsibility for the official seal, the office of chamberlain, and office of correspondence. The qualification for the chief position likely include military skills, physical strength, loyalty to the caliph and administrative skills. Most of the known haras chiefs were mawali, freedman of non-Arab background. It was likely that many members were mawlas as well. The reason for choosing non-Arabs was the lack of tribal loyalties that might compromise an Arab's loyalty to the caliph. It is not uncommon for a person related to the Haras chief to succeed him.

The size of the haras varied, ranging from 300 during the reign of Umar ibn Abdul Aziz and 500 during the reign of al-Mahdi.

Weapon 
Accounts concerning the haras mentioned that its members were armed with lances or short spears called hirab (plural of harba) and iron clubs or maces called 'umud. Other accounts also said that the members used whips. The chiefs commonly used swords, and their appointment occasionally were accompanied by ceremonially receiving a sword.  The chiefs were also reported to use chains as instrument for torture.

Function 
The main role of the haras was to act as the personal bodyguards of the caliphs. Haras members were known to guard the caliph even during private meetings, at night and during prayers at the mosque.

Occasionally, they were also used by the reigning caliph to intimidate political opposition. For example, when Muawiyah demanded that individuals accept his son Yazid as his successor and pledge allegiance to him, haras members were sent to intimidate reluctant individuals. Yazid was also reported to have sent some haras members to Abdullah ibn Zubair to ensure Abdullah's allegiance.

See also

 Anglo-Saxon military organization
 Comitatus
 Druzhina
 Fyrd
 Gabiniani
 German Guard
 Hird
 Huskarl
 Rashidun army
 Leidang
 Mannerbund
 Maryannu
 Mesedi
 Somatophylakes
 Thingmen
 Varangian Guard

References

Sources

 

9th century in Al-Andalus
Medieval bodyguards
Military history of the Umayyad Caliphate
7th-century establishments in the Umayyad Caliphate